Twelfth Avenue is a short portion of the West Side Highway in Manhattan.

Twelfth Avenue could also refer to:

13th Avenue (Borough Park), the commercial center of Borough Park, Brooklyn
12th Avenue South Bridge, a permanent steel bridges in Seattle.
Clinton Street/Southeast 12th Avenue station, a train station in Portland, Oregon.
Washington/Southeast 12th Avenue station, a train station in Hillsboro, Oregon.
Judah and 12th Avenue station, a train station in San Francisco, California.